Cystiscus viridis is a species of very small sea snail that around the coast of Australia. A marine gastropod mollusk or micromollusk in the family Cystiscidae.

Description
The length of the shell attains 1.85 mm.

Distribution
This marine species occurs off New Caledonia.

References

Cystiscidae
Gastropods described in 2003
Viridis